The men's eight competition at the 2012 Summer Olympics in London took place at Dorney Lake which, for the purposes of the Games venue, was officially termed Eton Dorney. It was held from 28 July to 1 August. There were 8 boats (72 competitors) from 8 nations. The event was won by Germany, the nation's first victory as "Germany" (the United Team of Germany, East Germany, and West Germany had combined for 5 gold medals). The German team beat the defending champions Canada, who took silver. Great Britain also slipped one place from their 2008 silver, taking bronze this time.

Background

This was the 26th appearance of the event. Rowing had been on the programme in 1896 but was cancelled due to bad weather. The men's eight has been held every time that rowing has been contested, beginning in 1900.

Germany was favoured; after a disappointing performance at Beijing (finishing outside the main final), the Germans had taken three straight World Championships. Other contenders included the defending champions (Canada) and the hosts, Great Britain.

For the third consecutive Games, no nations made their debut in the event. Seven of the eight teams had competed in all three of those Games, at least; by contrast, Ukraine made its first appearance since 1996. The United States made its 23nd appearance, most among nations to that point.

Qualification

Nations had been limited to one boat each since 1920. The 8 qualifiers were:

 7 boats from the 2011 World Championships
 1 boat from the Final Qualification Regatta

Competition format

The "eight" event featured nine-person boats, with eight rowers and a coxswain. It was a sweep rowing event, with the rowers each having one oar (and thus each rowing on one side). The course used the 2000 metres distance that became the Olympic standard in 1912 (with the exception of 1948). Races were held in up to six lanes.

The competition consisted of two main rounds (semifinals and finals) as well as a repechage. 

 Semifinals: Two heats of four boats each. The top boat in each heat (2 boats total) advanced directly to the "A" final, while all other boats (6 total) went to the repechage.
 Repechage: A single heat of six boats. The top four boats rejoined the semifinal winners in the "A" final, with the 5th and 6th place boats eliminated from medal contention and competing in the "B" final.
 Finals: The "A" final consisted of the top six boats, awarding medals and 4th through 6th place. The "B" final featured the next two boats, ranking them 7th and 8th.

Schedule

All times are British Summer Time (UTC+1)

Results

Semifinals

The winners of each heat qualified to the "A" final, while the remainder went to the repechage.

Semifinal 1

Semifinal 2

Repechage

The first four qualified for the "A" final.

Finals

Final B

Final A

References

Men's eight
Men's events at the 2012 Summer Olympics